Charles Hoover may refer to:

 Charlie Hoover (baseball) (1865–1905), catcher in Major League Baseball
 Charles Franklin Hoover (1865–1927), American physician